Bastrop County is located in the U.S. state of Texas.  It is in Central Texas and its county seat is Bastrop.

As of the 2020 census, the population was 97,216. Bastrop County is included in the Austin–Round Rock, Texas, metropolitan statistical area.

History
In 1834, the provincial legislature of Coahuila y Tejas – established by the Mexican Constitution of 1824 – met in Saltillo and established the Municipality and County of Mina consisting of parts of present-day Mason, Kimble, Llano, Burnet, Williamson, Gillespie, Blanco, Comal, Hays, Travis, Caldwell, Bastrop, Lee, Gonzales, Fayette, Washington and Lavaca Counties.

On December 14, 1837, the second Congress of the Republic of Texas adjusted geographical limits to create Fayette County, and remove Gonzales and Caldwell Counties from Mina's boundaries. On December 18, 1837, Sam Houston signed acts that (a) incorporated the town of Mina and (b) changed the name of the county and town of Mina to Bastrop to honor Felipe Enrique Neri, Baron de Bastrop, an early Dutch settler who helped Stephen F. Austin obtain land grants in Texas.

On May 24, 1838, the Republic of Texas added parts of Kimble and Comal Counties to contain parts of present-day Blanco, Burnet, Williamson, Travis, Hays, Comal, Caldwell, Bastrop, Lee, Gonzales, and Fayette counties.

From January 25, 1840, to January 25, 1850, Bastrop county limits shifted nearly to its present dimensions, including small portions of Lee, Williamson, Caldwell, Gonzales and Fayette Counties.

In December 1942, Bastrop was the site of an alleged military murder, in which Sgt. Walter Springs was gunned down by a White military police officer following a dispute. Springs was shot in the back, but the case remains largely unsolved to this day. A memorial scholarship in his honor has been active at his alma mater, Regis University, for most of the period since 1952 and has the backing of former NBA All Star Chauncey Billups.

In September 2011, Bastrop County suffered the most destructive wildfire in Texas history, which destroyed over 1,600 homes.

In March 2022, the Refuge Ranch, a facility in rural Bastrop County for girls who had been victims of sexual trafficking, was ordered closed down after allegations that the girls had been subjected to further exploitation by ranch staffers.

Geography

Adjacent counties
 Williamson County (north)
 Lee County (northeast)
 Fayette County (southeast)
 Caldwell County (southwest)
 Travis County (northwest)

Demographics

As of the census of 2000, 57,733 people, 20,097 households, and 14,771 families resided in the county.  The population density was 65 people per square mile (25/km2).  The 22,254 housing units averagedf 25 per square mile (10/km2).  The racial makeup of the county was 80.2% White, 8.8% African American, 0.7% Native American, 0.5% Asian, 7.7% from other races, and 2.2% from two or more races. About 24.0% of the population were Hispanic or Latino of any race.

Of the 20,097 households, 35.90% had children under the age of 18 living with them, 58.5% were married couples living together, 10.5% had a female householder with no husband present, and 26.5% were not families. About 21.5% of all households were made up of individuals, and 7.5% had someone living alone who was 65 years of age or older.  The average household size was 2.77 and the average family size was 3.23. As of the 2010 census, about 7.8 same-sex couples per 1,000 households lived in the county.

In the county, the population was distributed as 28.0% under the age of 18, 7.6% from 18 to 24, 31.3% from 25 to 44, 22.9% from 45 to 64, and 10.3% who were 65 years of age or older.  The median age was 35 years. For every 100 females there were 105.5 males.  For every 100 females age 18 and over, there were 104.8 males.

The median income for a household in the county was $43,578, and for a family was $49,456. Males had a median income of $32,843 versus $25,536 for females. The per capita income for the county was $18,146.  About 8.4% of families and 11.6% of the population were below the poverty line, including 15.4% of those under age 18 and 13.3% of those age 65 or over.

Historical research
Bastrop County has several societies and associations dedicated to preserving historical information and sites.

Education
The following school districts serve Bastrop County:
 Bastrop Independent School District
 Elgin Independent School District (partial)
 Lexington Independent School District (partial)
 McDade Independent School District
 Smithville Independent School District (partial)

Austin Community College is the designated community college for most of the county. Areas in Lexington ISD are in Blinn Junior College District.

Transportation
Central Texas Airport has been proposed about ten miles  NW of the town of Bastrop, but has met with local opposition.

Major highways
  U.S. Highway 290
  State Highway 21
  State Highway 71
  State Highway 95
  State Highway 304

Recreational facilities
 Bastrop State Park
 Buescher State Park

Communities

Cities 
 Bastrop (county seat)
 Elgin (partly in Travis County)
 Mustang Ridge (mostly in Travis County and a small part in Caldwell County)
 Smithville

Census-designated places 
 Camp Swift
 Cedar Creek
 Circle D-KC Estates
 McDade
 Paige
 Red Rock
 Rosanky
 Wyldwood

Unincorporated communities

 Alum Creek
 Bateman
 Butler
 Colorado
 Elysium
 Hills Prairie
 Jeddo
 Jordan
 Kovar
 Paige
 Pettytown (partly in Caldwell County)
 Rockne
 Salem
 Sayersville
 St. Mary's Colony
 String Prairie
 Swiftex
 Togo
 Upton
 Utley
 Watterson

Ghost Towns
 Flower Hill
 Grassyville
 McDuff
 Oak Hill
 Phelan
 Pin Oak

In popular culture
Several Hollywood feature films and notable independent films have used locations in Bastrop County.

Politics

See also

 List of museums in Central Texas
 National Register of Historic Places listings in Bastrop County, Texas
 Recorded Texas Historic Landmarks in Bastrop County

References

External links

 Bastrop County website
 
 Bastrop County from the Texas Almanac
 Bastrop County from the TXGenWeb Project
 Bastrop County Sheriff's Office

 
1837 establishments in the Republic of Texas
Populated places established in 1837
Majority-minority counties in Texas